Andrian Boykov Kraev (born 14 February 1999) is a Bulgarian professional footballer who plays as a midfielder for Levski Sofia.

Career
On 21 September 2020, Kraev signed for Levski Sofia on a one-year contract. He made his debut on 3 October in a 0–0 home draw against Botev Vratsa. In October 2021, Kraev signed a new contract, keeping him with the team until the summer of 2024.

Honours

Club
Levski Sofia
 Bulgarian Cup (1): 2021–22

Personal life
Andrian is the son of Boyko Kraev, a former professional footballer who played for Botev Vratsa, and brother of the Bulgarian international Bozhidar Kraev.

References

External links

1999 births
Living people
Bulgarian footballers
Association football midfielders
FC Botev Vratsa players
FC Hebar Pazardzhik players
PFC Levski Sofia players
First Professional Football League (Bulgaria) players
People from Vratsa